Between Your Legs is a 1999 Spanish drama film directed by Manuel Gómez Pereira which stars Victoria Abril, Javier Bardem and Carmelo Gómez. The story involves a Madrid screenwriter, whose life is being ruined by unauthorised circulation of his sexual fantasies on tape, and a police detective's wife who snatches quick moments with strange men. It was entered into the 49th Berlin International Film Festival.

Plot
Javier, a freelance screenwriter, and Miranda, a telephonist at a radio station, meet one evening at a therapy group to combat sex addiction. Javier's wife has left him because he was tricked by a woman called Azucena into recounting his sexual fantasies over a phoneline and cassettes of his imaginary activities are on sale throughout Madrid. Miranda, while walking her dog after her husband has gone to work and her daughter to school, can't resist quick encounters with men.

Immediately attracted to one another, in the car park after the session Javier and Miranda get into the back of an abandoned car. When a corpse is found in the car next morning, the police enquiry is headed by Félix, who is Miranda's husband. He would be delighted to pin the murder onto Javier, who he has seen with Miranda.

After putting all her sleeping pills into Félix's soup, Miranda goes with luggage and dog to the hotel where Javier is staying. While making love with her, he has a traumatic flashback. He had gone to the flat of Azucena, who was blackmailing him, and as they made love he discovered that “she” was a transvestite. Enraged beyond control at this further betrayal, he had killed “her” and put the body in the car. Going straight to the airport, Javier, Miranda and dog board a plane that looks Brazilian. Félix, having bought a puppy to replace the lost pet, meets his daughter off the school bus.

Cast

References

External links

1999 films
1999 drama films
Spanish drama films
1990s Spanish-language films
Films directed by Manuel Gómez Pereira
1990s Spanish films